F.X. Schumacher (March 14, 1892 – June 3, 1967) was a prominent forest biometrician. He served on the forestry faculty at The University of California before being called to work as chief of the section forest measurements, U.S. Forest Service. His interest in statistics led him to an affiliation with R.A. Fisher, and Schumacher led early advances to adopt statistical methods in forest inventories and silvicultural research. He joined the faculty of the Duke Graduate School of Forestry as one of its original seven faculty members. He co-authored textbooks on forest mensuration and sampling with other notable forest biometricians Donald Bruce and Roy A. Chapman. He was the first to apply the equation form Y = ea+b/X, widely known as the Schumacher equation, to timber growth and yield modeling.

In 1957 he was elected as a Fellow of the American Statistical Association.
Schumacher was named a Fellow, Society of American Foresters in 1959 and was awarded an honorary doctorate from North Carolina State University the same year.

References

Recipients of the Distinguished Service Cross (United States)
American foresters
1892 births
1967 deaths
Forestry researchers
University of Michigan alumni
Fellows of the American Statistical Association
People from Dayton, Ohio